New Horizons 2 (also New Horizons II, NHII, or NH2) was a proposed mission to the trans-Neptunian objects by NASA. It was conceived as a planetary flyby mission in 2002, based on the New Horizons spacecraft, which was in development at the time. In March 2005, the proposal was not selected for further development because of a shortage of plutonium-238 needed for the radioisotope thermoelectric generator (RTG). The New Horizons 2 study was funded out of the New Frontiers program, and was delivered to the U.S. Congress in June 2005.

Description
New Horizons 2 was included in the tentative budget for the New Frontiers program missions. In 2004 the United States Senate Appropriations Committee provided additional funding for New Horizons 2, a new Kuiper belt mission. As early as 2004 there was a conference on how to make the most use of New Horizons 2 Uranus flyby.

Candidate targets included 47171 Lempo, a system that, like Pluto–Charon, contains multiple bodies. The mission plan for Lempo also included flybys of Jupiter and Uranus, and perhaps four Kuiper belt objects (KBO). There was a lot of flexibility: even without a gravity assist any KBO within 50 AU and a 20-year flight time was possible. A flyby of Neptune's Triton was also considered, with 66652 Borasisi as a potential follow on.  was also considered to be visited, having a similar orbit as Lempo.

See also
Innovative Interstellar Explorer (2003 concept study for RTG powered ion-engined probe to 200 AU by 2030)
List of New Horizons topics

References

External links

New Horizons 2 Report

2
Missions to minor planets
New Frontiers program proposals